Vaillant is a commune in the Haute-Marne department in north-eastern France.

The village is located about 42 km north of Dijon on the Langres plateau, where the river Venelle, a tributary of the river Tille, has its source.

See also
Communes of the Haute-Marne department

References

Communes of Haute-Marne